

Medalists

Seeds
Singles matches were best of 7 games in the main draw.

  Ding Ning
  Liu Shiwen
  Feng Tianwei (quarterfinals)
  Zhu Yuling (semifinals)
  Chen Meng (semifinals)
  Kasumi Ishikawa (quarterfinals)
  Guo Yue (quarterfinals)
  Ai Fukuhara (fourth round)
  Seo Hyo-Won (fourth round)
  Seok Ha-Jung (fourth round)
  Yang Ha-Eun (third round)
  Yu Mengyu (quarterfinals)
  Sayaka Hirano (fourth round)
  Lee Ho Ching (fourth round)
  Huang Yi-Hua (fourth round)
  Misaki Morizono (second round)

Draw

Finals

Section 1

Section 2

Section 3

Section 4

Section 5

Section 6

Section 7

Section 8

References
 21st Asian Championships Busan 2013 Competition Schedule Draw and Results

2013 Asian Table Tennis Championships